Acharya Debaprasad Ghosh (15 March 1894 – 14 July 1985) was an Indian mathematician, linguist, lawyer, journalist, educationist and statesman. He started his career at the age of 21 as a professor of mathematics at the Ripon College. He was actively involved in politics as the President of Bharatiya Jana Sangh from 1956 to 1965, except for the period between 1960 and 1962. He was the longest serving opposition party leader in Indian history, and the fourth longest serving leader of any political party after Prime Minister Jawaharlal Nehru, Prime Minister Indira Gandhi and Prime Minister Manmohan Singh.

Early life 
Debaprasad was born in a Bengali Hindu Kayastha family on 15 March 1894 in the village of Gava, in the district of Barisal, in eastern Bengal, now in Bangladesh. His father Kshetranath Ghosh was professor of philosophy at the Brajamohan College in Barisal. His mother Annadasundari Devi was a poet.

Debaprasad ranked first in the Entrance Examination in 1908 from Brajamohan School in Barisal. In 1910, he again ranked first in the I.A. from Brajamohan College. In spite of that he was denied scholarship as both his school and college were connected with the Swadeshi Movement. In 1912, Debaprasad stood first in B.A.(Mathematics) from City College, Kolkata and obtained the Ishan scholarship. He completed M.A. in Mathematics in the year 1914. He was also conferred with the title, " Ramanujan of modern times". His impeccable academic record says that he has never stood second ever in his life.His brother, Satyavrata Ghosh and his sister Shantisudha Ghosh were prominent Freedom Fighters. Later  he was a professor of mathematics in Rangpur  Carmichael college

References

External links
 BJP - timeline

1894 births
1985 deaths
People from West Bengal
City College, Kolkata alumni
University of Calcutta alumni
Bharatiya Janata Party politicians from West Bengal
People from Barisal
People from Barisal District
Bharatiya Jana Sangh politicians
Rajya Sabha members from West Bengal